Josip Marohnić (November 12, 1866 – January 23, 1921) remains up to this day the most influential Croatian emigrant in the Americas.

Marohnić was born in Hreljin, Croatia (then in Austria-Hungary) and lived in the United States for 28 years, where he emigrated alone in 1893 and was later joined by his wife Andrijana and daughter Josipa. He started working at a Chicago's local printing house before attending Wheaton College (Illinois). He later founded his own print house and bookstore, and became publisher, writer and editor of his newspaper "Hrvatski glasnik".

In 1897 Marohnić moved to Pittsburgh where he founded the Eastern Catholic St. Nicholas Parish, the first Croatian church in America, and invited a Croatian pastor to spiritually lead Croatian-Americans. He acted as the main accountant of the National Croatian Community (preceding the Croatian Fraternal Union founded on 11th convention) between 1897 and 1909. He was also the founding father and lifetime President of the Croatian Fraternal Union from 1912 until his death on January 23, 1921, leaving behind his wife and four children. Marohnić devoted his life to Croatians in the US and they honored him with a magnificent funeral.

Marohnić founded the "First Croatian Bookstore" in Allegheny, Pennsylvania. As an editor, he published books, manuals, grammars, dictionaries, calendars, novels, anthologies, short stories, theatrical works, humorous books, collections of poetry, various books of folklore, maps, albums, breviaries and books of religious nature. He was the first poet among Croatian emigrants, having published his collections "Jesenke" in 1897 and "Amerikanke" in 1900 and his "Census of Croats in America". In 1911, he was the first Croat officially invited by an American president.

A street in Trnje, Zagreb, the Croatian capital, was named after him; the street is now the site of SRCE ("Sveučilišni računski centar" - "University Computing Centre").

See also 
 Croatian Fraternal Union

References

External links 
 St. Nicholas Parish, Pittsburgh Today; alternative page
 Croatian Fraternal Union

1866 births
1921 deaths
19th-century Croatian people
19th-century American people
American poetry in immigrant languages 
Croatian Eastern Catholics
American Eastern Catholics
Religious leaders from Pittsburgh
American people of Croatian descent
Croatian Austro-Hungarians
Eastern Catholic poets
Wheaton College (Illinois) alumni
People from Bakar
Austro-Hungarian emigrants to the United States